Public Flipper Limited is the second live album by San Francisco-based punk rock band Flipper, released in 1986 by Subterranean Records. It contains recordings from 1980–85. The title is a nod to John Lydon's post-punk outfit Public Image Ltd. Earlier the same year Public Image Ltd. had released an album titled Album whose title resembled that of Flipper's debut release, Album.

Critical reception
Trouser Press wrote that the "obnoxious onstage patter only adds to the mind-boggling raucous entertainment."

Track list

Side 1 (20:46)
 New Rules No Rules (2/24/80, San Francisco) (2:19)
 Hard Cold World (3/14/82, Washington DC) (7:47)
 I'm Fighting (2/24/80, San Francisco) (2:40)
 The Game's Got a Price (11/15/80, San Francisco) (8:00)

Side 2 (22:10)
 Love Canal (9/6/80, Berkeley) (4:03)
 Oh-Oh-Ay-Oh (2/24/80, San Francisco) (1:44)
 We Don't Understand (2/6/82, San Francisco) (7:30)
 If I Can't Be Drunk (6/22/82, San Francisco) (8:53)

Side 3 (20:53)
 Sex Bomb (12/31/84, New York City) (10:21)
 Brainwash (3/14/82, Washington DC) (0:59)
 (I Saw You) Shine (4/1/82, San Francisco) (9:33)

Side 4 (22:00)
 Southern California (1/26/85, Los Angeles) (4:43)
 Life (8/6/83, Berkeley) (5:42)
 The Wheel (2/6/82, San Francisco) (5:19)
 Flipper Blues (1/5/85, Toronto) (6:16)

Personnel
 Ted Falconi – guitar
 Steve DePace – drums
 Bruce Loose – vocals, bass
 Will Shatter – vocals, bass

References

Flipper (band) albums
1986 live albums
Subterranean Records albums
Domino Recording Company albums